is a Japanese classical pianist. He is a regular piano soloist at La Scala, Italy's leading opera house.

Life 
Takahiro Yoshikawa (born November 8, 1973) grew up in Nishinomiya. Both of his parents are classical musicians.

Personal life 
Takahiro Yoshikawa is married to an Italian and has two children.

Career 
Yoshikawa started playing the piano at a young age. He graduated at the music department of the Tokyo University of the Arts under the guidance of Takako Horie. During his tenancy in Tokyo, he frequently travelled to Europe to complete a masterclass by German pianist Conrad Hansen. After completing his Master in Tokyo in 1999, he won the Bösendorfer Award by the famous Austrian piano manufacturer from Vienna shortly before moving permanently to Europe to complete his studies at the academy of La Scala.

In the years after, he continued his studies in Italy learning from Anita Porrini (herself a student of famous pianist Alfred Cortot) as well as attending courses to master the art of composition by Silvia Bianchera Bettinelli.

Since 2011, Yoshikawa has received acknowledgement for frequent performances in Italy at La Scala as soloist and for accompanying the La Scala Theatre Ballet for performances in Japan broadcast nationally by NHK, the public broadcasting corporation of Japan.

In 2015, Deutsche Grammophon released a classical record with duets of Fabrizio Meloni, the clarinet soloist of La Scala, and Yoshikawa. They subsequently toured together in Japan and Italy.
Following the collaboration with Meloni, he published a record expanding his interpretation of works by composer Claude Debussy and received a positive critic by WCRB.

In 2019, he was referenced for the first time with a favorable review in the American Record Guide for his performance of Liszt on a Steinway C-227 piano.

Discography

References

External links
Official Website

Year of birth missing (living people)
21st-century classical pianists
21st-century Japanese male musicians
Japanese classical pianists
Japanese male classical pianists
Living people